The Tunisia women's national under-20 football team(), nicknamed Les Aigles de Carthage (The Eagles of Carthage or The Carthage Eagles), is the national team of Tunisia and is controlled by the Tunisian Football Federation. The team competes in the UNAF U-20 Women's Tournament and the African U-20 Women's World Cup qualification and the FIFA U-20 Women's World Cup.

History

Results and fixtures
The following is a list of match results in the last 12 months, as well as any future matches that have been scheduled.

Legend

2023

Coaching staff

Current coaching staff

Manager history
 Samir Landolsi ( – )

Players

Current squad
The following players were named for the 2023 UNAF U-20 Women's Tournament on Marsh 2023 .

Previous squads

UNAF U-20 Women's Tournament
2023 UNAF U-20 Women's Tournament squads

Competitive record

 Champions   Runners-up   Third place   Fourth place  

Red border color indicates tournament was held on home soil.

FIFA U-20 Women's World Cup

African U-20 Women's World Cup qualification record

UNAF U-20 Women's Tournament record

Honours

See also
Tunisian Football Federation
Tunisia women's national football team
Tunisia women's national under-17 football team

References

External links
Official website
FIFA profile

National
Arabic women's national under-20 association football teams
African women's national under-20 association football teams
U